Herbert Alan Gerwig (April 26, 1931 – November 10, 2011) was an American professional wrestler, better known by his ring name of Killer Karl Kox, who competed in the National Wrestling Alliance as well as international promotions such as All Japan Pro Wrestling, the International Wrestling Alliance and World Championship Wrestling during the 1960s and 1970s.

Career
Gerwig began his career in 1956. Rumors were that in 1957, Kox earned the name, Killer, when he performed his famous finishing move, the brainbuster, on his opponent by holding him upside down for a period of time and allowing the blood to rush to the brain. As a singles heel through the sixties, he was a top-of-card fixture battling well-established crowd favorites such as Mark Lewin, Spiros Arion, Tex McKenzie, Dominic Denucci and Mario Milano. Enormous numbers from Australia's nascent ethnic community turned out to support Arion, Denucci and Milano, and Kox risked riots at every appearance. 

On February 21, 1967, he and Iron Mike DiBiase defeated Pedro Morales & Ricky Romero to win the WWA World Tag Team titles. He defeated Buddy Rogers to win the MWCW North American title in March 1968. Fans longed to see the brainbuster deployed on the side of good, and this boon was granted in 1971 when the Killer turned into a babyface in a nationally televised mea culpa - he pledged to change his ways on a solemn promise to his dying mother. 

This created much heat in the already booming Australian wrestling promotion, where the fixture was an ongoing television "war" between the good guys referred to as "The People's Army" (Lewin, Curtis, Arion, Milano and visiting faces from overseas) and the "mercenary soldiers" managed by Kentucky biker / preacher Big Bad John. The turning of the tables saw the erstwhile Killer create great excitement in tag matches against his former heel comrades Abdullah the Butcher, Brute Bernard, Dick "The Bulldog" Brower, Tiger Singh, Waldo Von Erich and Japanese heels like Mr Fuji and the Tojo Brothers. 

He lost to Johnny Weaver on May 4, 1973, in a Hair vs Mask match while working as The Masked Menace. He won the Florida Brass Knucks title by winning a tournament, and also defended the title against Rocky Johnson and Steve Keirn. In February 1978, he defeated Dusty Rhodes to win the Florida heavyweight title. 

At a wrestling show later that year, Kox was wrestling a match when a fan started to repeatedly hit him with an umbrella. Security got involved and detained the fan, but instead of kicking the fan out of the show, Kox requested that they bring him into a backroom with the door locked. He allegedly requested that security not let him out until it was alright doing so. Security took the fan to a back room and locked the door. After Kox's match ended, he told security to open the door and he went in. Five minutes later, Kox walked out of the room and the fan was found lying on the floor, covered in blood and was knocked out unconscious.

In the wrestling profession, Killer Karl Kox was always a popular figure for his humor, behind-the-scenes practical jokes and inventiveness in furthering the promotion ("the greatest gimmicks man in the business" said one admiring colleague). His grudge matches were well-calibrated and exciting, building through a series of disqualifications and non-decisions through run-in interference, and often climaxing in a conditional match in which "the loser packs his bags and leaves town." This saw off one or the other of the combatants as they travelled to fulfill other promotional runs in other countries; battle would be re-joined next season when the participants returned for another highly profitable run. 

Dick Murdoch once listed a number of people he had supposedly defeated and put out of wrestling, including a midget wrestler from the 1940s (few people caught the joke reference) and also listed on Herb Gelwig, (who was of course Killer Karl Kox with whom he teamed several times and was still quite active.) On October 9, 1979, he defeated Wahoo McDaniel to win the Georgia State Heavyweight title. He was cheered in Australia for one of the few times in his life when he faced the team of Abdullah & Bulldog Brower. He then retired in 1982. 

Among Killer Karl Kox's famous matches in Australia, his feuds with man-mountain Haystacks Calhoun usually involved the insinuation of foreign objects into the proceedings by Kox. At the end of one season, Kox "left Australia for medical treatment in the states" when, in a strap match with Bulldog Brower, his eye was nearly removed (the wound was unbandaged to show the television audience). A headline making event was when a television match for the Australian championship against Spiros Arion was declared ended due to time limit by well-loved commentator Jack Little. 

Kox responded by applying the Brain Buster to the unfortunate Little, who was hospitalized and required to call matches the following month in a neck brace. Kox made his final wrestling-related appearance at VCCW Quest for the Crown II in August 2011, taking part in a meet and greet as well as later presenting the championship to Scot Summers.

Death
On November 10, 2011, Kox died at the age of 80 following a heart attack and a stroke he had suffered nearly three weeks prior, in October 20.

Championships and accomplishments
All Japan Pro Wrestling
NWA International Tag Team Championship (1 time) - with Cyclone Negro
American Wrestling Association
Nebraska Heavyweight Championship (1 time)
Central States Wrestling
NWA Central States Heavyweight Championship (1 time)
NWA Central States Tag Team Championship (1 time) – with Takachiho
NWA North American Tag Team Championship (Central States version) (2 times) – with K.O. Kox
Championship Wrestling from Florida
NWA Brass Knuckles Championship (Florida version) (3 times)
NWA Florida Heavyweight Championship (1 time)
NWA United States Tag Team Championship (Florida version) (4 times) - with Bobby Duncum (1), Dick Slater (1), and Jimmy Garvin (2)
Georgia Championship Wrestling
NWA Georgia Heavyweight Championship (1 time)
NWA Macon Heavyweight Championship (1 time)
Japan Wrestling Association
All Asia Tag Team Championship (1 time) - with Joe Carollo
NWA Big Time Wrestling
NWA Brass Knuckles Championship (Texas version) (3 times)
NWA Texas Tag Team Championship (1 time) - with Great Malenko
NWA World Tag Team Championship (Texas Version) (1 time) with Fritz Von Erich
NWA Tri-State - Mid-South Wrestling Association
Mid-South Tag Team Championship (1 time) - with Junkyard Dog
NWA North American Heavyweight Championship (Tri-State version) (1 time)
NWA United States Tag Team Championship (Tri-State version) (3 times) - with Dick Murdoch (1), Bob Sweetan (1), and Ken Patera (1)
NWA Western States Sports
NWA Brass Knuckles Championship (Amarillo version) (1 time)
NWA Western States Heavyweight Championship (1 time)
Professional Wrestling Hall of Fame and Museum
Class of 2020
Pro Wrestling Illustrated
PWI ranked him # 417 of the 500 best singles wrestlers during the "PWI Years" in 2003
Southeastern Championship Wrestling
NWA Southeastern Heavyweight Championship (Northern Division) (3 times)
Texas Wrestling Hall of Fame
Class of 2013
World Championship Wrestling (Australia)
IWA World Heavyweight Championship (3 times)
IWA World Tag Team Championship (1 time) - with Skull Murphy

References

External links
Championship Wrestling from Florida: Killer Karl Kox
Profile at Online World of Wrestling
CageMatch.de - Herb Gerwig 

1931 births
2011 deaths
American male professional wrestlers
United States Marine Corps personnel of the Korean War
Sportspeople from Baltimore
People from Dallas
Professional wrestlers from Maryland
Professional wrestlers from Texas
Professional Wrestling Hall of Fame and Museum
United States Marines
The Heenan Family members
20th-century professional wrestlers
All Asia Tag Team Champions
NWA Florida Heavyweight Champions
NWA Brass Knuckles Champions (Florida version)
WCWA Brass Knuckles Champions
NWA United States Tag Team Champions (Florida version)
NWA Americas Tag Team Champions
IWA World Heavyweight Champions (Australia)
IWA World Tag Team Champions (Australia)
NWA International Tag Team Champions
NWA Macon Heavyweight Champions
NWA Georgia Heavyweight Champions
NWA National Television Champions